USS Bebas (DE-10) was an Evarts-class destroyer escort in the service of the United States Navy from 1943 to 1945.

Namesake
Gus George Bebas was born on 24 February 1914 in Chicago, Illinois. He received his commission as an Ensign in the United States Naval Reserve on 26 May 1938. Bebas attended the Northwestern University School of Engineering, earning a B.S. degree in commerce in 1939. While at Northwestern, Bebas served in the Naval Reserve Officer Training Corps at that institution, and trained on board heavy cruiser  between 16 and 30 June 1939. His commission as an ensign terminated under honorable conditions on 22 January 1940, Bebas enlisted the following day as a seaman second class. He completed one stint of elimination flight training at Naval Reserve Aviation Base Glenview between 14 February and 14 March 1940, and a second between 15 December 1940 and 15 January 1941. His enlistment terminated under honorable conditions on 19 February, he both received appointment as an aviation cadet, USNR, and reported for training at Naval Air Station Pensacola, Florida the following day. Transferred to Naval Air Station Miami for further active duty undergoing training on 4 August, he was appointed a naval aviator (heavier than air) No. 8779, on 5 September. Released from active duty involving training on 25 September, he received promotion to ensign, A-V(N), USNR, the following day. Assigned to the Advanced Carrier Training Group, Atlantic Fleet, on 26 September, he reported to the Curtiss SBC Helldiver equipped Bombing Squadron 8 (VB-8), part of the  Air Group on 23 December 1941.

When Hornet sailed for the Pacific in March 1942, VB-8 was serving on board, ultimately re-equipping with the Douglas SBD Dauntless as that dive bomber became available in quantity. During the first day of the Battle of Midway, 4 June 1942, Bebas flew with VB-8 in the first strike from Task Force 16, but his squadron did not locate the enemy, flying to Midway Atoll and then, after refueling, back to the ship. The next afternoon, 5 June, he participated in the search for the damaged Imperial Japanese Navy aircraft carrier Hiryū, rumored to be nearby. Not finding it (Hiryū had actually sunk long before), VB-8 attacked the destroyer Tanikaze instead. Bebas's bomb missed that ship, falling  from its port quarter. On the afternoon of 6 June, he took part in strikes flown against the heavy cruisers Mogami and Mikuma and their screening destroyers, scoring a damaging near miss on Mogami in the face of heavy antiaircraft fire. This earned him the Distinguished Flying Cross.

Hornet returned to Pearl Harbor following the Battle of Midway, and its air group, shore-based, returned to operational training. Instead of immediately recovering, however, Bebas "entered a relatively steep right turn…" and either blacked-out or could not overcome the heavy stick forces present in the dive, and his SBD-3 (BuNo 4573) crashed into the ocean, killing Bebas and his passenger, Ensign William M. Stevens, D-V(G), USNR.

History
Originally allocated to the Royal Navy under lend lease, BDE-10 was laid down on 27 November 1942 at the Boston Navy Yard. The ships was launched on 9 January 1943 and reallocated to the United States Navy on 25 January 1943. Sponsored by Mrs. Angeline M. Bebas, Ens. Bebas's mother, in a special christening ceremony just before commissioning, she was commissioned at Boston, Massachusetts on 15 May 1943.

Operational history
After arriving off Bermuda on 17 June for shakedown, the destroyer escort steamed back to the New York Navy Yard for repairs between 24 and 29 June. After returning to Bermudan waters to resume her interrupted shakedown training, Bebas completed that evolution during July and then spent the next few weeks in coastal escort and patrol operations out of Casco Bay in Maine, Boston, New York, and Norfolk, Virginia.

Upon departing Hampton Roads on 24 August in company with three of her sister ships, Bebas sailed for the Pacific. After transiting the Panama Canal on 1 September, she proceeded via the Galapagos and Society Islands to Espiritu Santo in the New Hebrides. The warship operated out of that port during October and November, conducting patrol and escort missions to Nouméa, New Caledonia, and to Guadalcanal in the Solomons. Highlighting this service was her attempt to salvage the Liberty ship John H. Couch that had been set ablaze by a Japanese aerial torpedo during a raid on the night of 11 October.

Bebas, patrolling an antisubmarine sector off Lunga and Koli Points, Guadalcanal, went to general quarters at 0149 to investigate a "fire explosion at sea." The destroyer escort then determined the fire to be on board a beached ship, and reduced speed to draw closer. Going alongside at 0600, Bebas sent over her fire and rescue party to fight gasoline fires raging in John H. Couch's holds two and three, but the flames had gained the upper hand. After recovering her men, the warship backed away and shelled the merchantman's number two hold, in an attempt to stop the fire or to sink the ship.

Bebas was subsequently assigned "killer operations and local escort" duty under the auspices of the Commanding General, Fiji Island garrison, and carried out those tasks through January 1944. She then resumed convoy escort and patrol work in the Solomons, New Hebrides, and New Caledonia areas. In April 1944, the destroyer escort returned to the United States for an overhaul at Hunters Point.

Clearing the west coast on 30 May, Bebas proceeded via Pearl Harbor to the Marshall Islands and reached Eniwetok on 27 June for convoy escort duty between Pearl Harbor and the Marshalls through the end of July. She then joined a "hunter-killer" task group formed around the escort carrier  and provided support for the occupation of the Western Carolines and for the invasion of the Philippines at Leyte.

Next, after performing screening and escort duties out of the Palaus and Ulithi late in October, Bebas underwent repairs at Espiritu Santo and then escorted shipping between the Palaus, Ulithi, and Eniwetok during the first three months of 1945.

On 2 February 1945, Bebas cleared Eniwetok in company with the tankers  and SS Egg Harbor, bound for Ulithi. On the second night out, Bebas and her two charges identified another convoy as friendly and then picked up a surface radar contact which a quick exchange of information showed to be "definitely suspicious." Radar plot indicated that the contact was crossing the track of both convoys.

Bebas obtained permission from the convoy commodore to pursue the target and went to general quarters. The quarry disappeared, but was picked up on sonar—a definite submarine. Reducing speed to carry out a deliberate attack, Bebas stalked the submarine. Soon after her first "hedgehog" attack failed, she followed up with a second and heard one sharp and two muffled detonations soon thereafter. A third "hedgehog" pattern yielded negative results.

An hour later, wood fragments, varying in length from two to ten feet, found on the water near the attack location prompted Bebas to carry out a box search through the night; and, the following morning, four other destroyer escorts and an Eniwetok-based PBM Martin Mariner patrol bomber joined the search. Late in the search, the PBM sent them to a concentrated oil slick about four miles (6 km) from the site of the "hedgehog" attack on the previous night. Bebas took samples of the slick—heavy sludge or a mixture of lubricating oil and fuel oil—as well as a piece of wood. That afternoon, the four destroyer escorts parted company with Bebas, but  joined her to continue the hunt. Further investigations yielded no additional evidence, and the search was terminated at noon on 6 February. Postwar accounting indicated no Japanese submarine losses that day, so the identity of Bebas''' target remains a mystery.Bebas then participated in the invasion of Okinawa, escorting transports and patrolling in the antisubmarine screen off the beachhead. While so engaged on 12 May, she rescued Lt. Robert R. Klingman, USMC, of VMF-312, after his F4U Corsair had suffered hydraulic system failure. The destroyer escort then screened refueling groups supporting carrier strikes on the Japanese homeland in July before proceeding to Hawaii for repairs and alterations.

She entered Pearl Harbor on 3 August and was still there on 15 August when Japan agreed to capitulate, ending the war. On 4 September, Bebas departed Oahu for the west coast of the United States. Reaching San Francisco, California on 9 September, Bebas shifted to San Pedro and was decommissioned there on 18 October 1945. Her name was struck from the Navy list on 1 November 1945, and she was sold to the Pacific Bridge Co., San Francisco, in January 1947 for scrapping.Bebas'' (DE-10) was awarded three battle stars for her World War II service.

Awards

References 

 
 https://www.baseballsgreatestsacrifice.com/biographies/bebas_gus.html

Evarts-class destroyer escorts
World War II frigates and destroyer escorts of the United States
Ships built in Boston
1943 ships